Česko Slovenská SuperStar (English: Czech&Slovak SuperStar) is the joint Czech-Slovak version of Idol series' Pop Idol merged from Česko hledá SuperStar and Slovensko hľadá SuperStar which previous to that had three individual seasons each.
The second season premiered in February 2011 with castings held in Prague, Brno, Bratislava and Košice. It is broadcast on two channels: «TV Nova» (Czech Republic) and «Markíza» (Slovakia) which have also been the broadcast stations for the individual seasons. Also both hosts have been their hosts countries before as have been three out of the four judges.
To legitimate a fair chance for each country's contestants to reach the final, twelve of the contestants will compete split into genders and nationalities in the semifinals, guaranteeing a 50% share for each country in the top 12.

Regional auditions
Auditions were held in Bratislava, Košice, Prague, Brno in the winter of 2010–2011.

Divadlo
In Divadlo (Theater) were 100 contestants. The contestants first emerged on stage in groups of 9 or 10 but performed solo unaccompanied, and those who did not impress the judges were cut after the group finished their individual performances. 40 made it to the next round Dlouhá cesta. 24 contestants made it to the Semi-final.

Semi-final
24 semifinalists were revealed in March when the show premiered on screen. Six boys and six girls from both countries competed for a spot in the top 12. In three Semifinals the guys performed on Saturday and the girls on Sunday night. The following Monday the lowest vote getter from each gender and country got eliminated (the viewers could vote for contestants from both countries). It means that three Czech and Slovak boys and three Czech and Slovak girls would make the finals.

Top 24 - Females

Top 24 - Males

Top 20 - Females

Top 20 - Males

Top 16 - Females

Top 16 - Males

Finalist

Finals

Twelve contestants made it to the finals. TOP 12 consists of 3 Slovak boys, 3 Czech boys, 3 Slovak girls and 3 Czech girls. The first single recorded by TOP 12 is called "Nevzdávám" (Ain't Giving Up). Every final night has its theme. Audience can vote for contestants from the very beginning of the show, voting ends during result show day after. There were double eliminations in first two final rounds while only one contestant is being eliminated once the candidates got reduced to TOP 8. All gender and nationality quotas are abolished in the finals.

Top 12 – My Idol

Top 10 – Czech and Slovak Hits

Top 8 – Dance

Top 7 – Rock

 TOP 7 Performance: Láska je tu s nami(Peter Nagy and Indigo)

Top 7 – Helena Vondráčková's Choice and Duets
Mentor: Helena Vondráčková

Top 5 – Elán and Lucie

Top 4 – ABBA and Queen

 TOP 4 Performance: Dancing Queen  (ABBA) and We Will Rock You  (Queen)

Top 3 – Miroslav Žbirka, Judges' Choice, Idol's Choice
Mentor: Miroslav Žbirka

Top 2 – Finale

 TOP 12 Performance: Let Me Entertain You  (Robbie Williams)

Elimination chart

Contestants who appeared on other seasons/shows
 Petr Ševčík was a contestant from Česko Slovenská Superstar 2009 where he was eliminated in Divadlo round.

See also
 Česko Slovenská SuperStar: Výběr finálových hitů (soundtrack album)

References

External links 
Official Czech homepage hosted by Nova
Official Slovak homepage hosted by Markíza

Season 02
2011 Czech television seasons
2011 Slovak television seasons